Cabruñana is one of 28 parishes (administrative divisions) in the municipality of Grado, within the province and autonomous community of Asturias, in northern Spain.

The population is 46 (INE 2007).

Villages and hamlets
 Cabruñana
 Los Llanos

References 

Parishes in Grado